Lepsøya (or Løvsøya) is a populated island in Ålesund Municipality in Møre og Romsdal county, Norway. The  island in the northern part of the municipality. It is located in the ocean in the northwestern part of the municipality, with the Haramsfjorden and the island of Haramsøya to the northeast; the Vigrafjorden and the island of Vigra (in Giske Municipality) to the southwest; and the islands of Bjørnøya and Terøya along with the mainland to the southeast.

In 2015, the population of the island was 313. Most of the population lives on the southeastern side of the island. The island is connected to the mainland and to the village of Austnes on Haramsøya island via a car ferry.

The new Nordøyvegen bridge and tunnel project will connect the island of Lepsøya to the mainland when it is completed in 2021.

See also
List of islands of Norway

References

Ålesund
Islands of Møre og Romsdal